The Musical Instrument Museum (MIM) is located in Phoenix, Arizona. Opened in April 2010, it is the largest museum of its type in the world. The collection of over 15,000 musical instruments and associated objects includes examples from nearly 200 countries and territories, representing every inhabited continent. Some larger countries such as the United States, Mexico, India, China, and Brazil have multiple displays with subsections for different types of ethnic, folk, and tribal music.

Overview
 
The Museum was founded by Robert J. Ulrich, former CEO and chairman of Target Corporation. A collector of African art and a world museum enthusiast, Ulrich and his friend Marc Felix originated the idea after a visit to the Musical Instrument Museum in Brussels, Belgium. The design of the museum benefited as well from the consultation of the Musée de la Musique in Paris modernised in 1997.

The contemporary building covers approximately 200,000 square-feet, with two floors of galleries. The exhibit for each country features a flat-screen high-resolution video showing local musicians performing on native instruments. Visitors can listen to the performances through a wireless device with headphones that is activated automatically when an exhibit is being observed.

The facility contains a 299-seat theater for concerts, which are held primarily after regular hours. Joshua Bell recorded his album "French Impressions" in the theater in 2011. There is also a cafe with both indoor and outdoor seating.

A large number of musical artists have appeared at MIM, including Martha Reeves, Lyle Lovett, Wanda Jackson, Jordin Sparks, Ronnie Spector, Altan, Ramsey Lewis, and George Benson.

Layout

Ground Floor 
 The Artist Gallery – Instruments, video concert footage, photographs, performance outfits, and other special items linked to notable musicians and music innovators. The gallery has included exhibits for musical artists such as Elvis Presley, Pablo Casals, John Lennon, King Sunny Adé, Taylor Swift, and many others from around the world.
 The Experience Gallery – MIM’s Experience Gallery invites guests of all ages to touch, play, and hear a changing array of instruments from many different cultures. Guests can try their hands at new instruments such as drums, guitars, and harps.
 The Mechanical Music Gallery – MIM’s Mechanical Music Gallery features a selection of musical instruments such as player pianos, mechanical zithers, and cylinder music boxes that, by definition, “play themselves.”
 The Target Gallery – The Target Gallery complements the museum’s permanent collection with traveling shows, special engagements, and changing exhibitions.
 The Conservation Lab – Seen through a large viewing window, MIM’s Conservation Lab gives guests a behind-the-scenes glimpse at collection maintenance and preservation.
 Café Allegro – Café Allegro serves a daily-changing menu of foods. Stations feature global cuisine, local and regional dishes, grilled specialties, freshly made soups and salads, and desserts.
 Museum Store – The Museum Store is open daily to the public during museum hours and offers gift cards, a selection of books and CDs, instruments, handmade gifts and other musical things.
 MIM Music Theater – This concert hall offers an array of concerts by artists from every corner of the globe.

Upper Level 
MIM’s collection is presented in Geographical Galleries that focus on five major world regions. Here it contains ethnic, tribal, and folk musical instruments or musical instruments from various parts of the world, These are:
 The Africa and Middle East gallery, which displays instruments and artifacts from sub-Saharan, North African, and Middle Eastern nations.
 The Asia and Oceania gallery, which features instruments from countries and island groups in five sub-galleries devoted to regions of East Asia, South Asia, Southeast Asia, Oceania, and Central Asia and the Caucasus.
 The Europe gallery, where guests encounter instruments ranging from an antique charter horn and a foot-operated drum kit to a child’s vessel flute.
 The Latin America gallery, which features instruments and ensembles displayed in three sub-galleries: South America; Central America and Mexico; and the Caribbean.
 The United States/Canada gallery, where guests can observe an array of instruments that shaped the North American musical landscape, including the Appalachian dulcimer, sousaphone, ukulele, and electric guitar. Special exhibits focus on American musical-instrument manufacturers, including Fender, Martin, and Steinway.

Museum galleries
The museum is a collection of instruments and exhibits including geographic galleries that focus on the five major world regions.

The Artist Gallery of the Musical Instrumental Museum of Phoenix is where visitors can see the clothes worn by many singers. They can also see and hear the original instruments played by Elvis Presley, Roy Orbison, Johnny Cash, John Lennon, Carlos Santana, Tito Puente, Taylor Swift and many other artists from around the world.

See also

 Musical Instrument Museum (disambiguation)
 List of music museums

References

Bibliography

External links

 Official museum website
 Robert Ulrich Interview NAMM Oral History Library (2010)

Museums in Phoenix, Arizona
Musical instrument museums in the United States
Buildings and structures completed in 2010
Museums established in 2010
2010 establishments in Arizona